JJC may refer to:

 Jennifer Jo Cobb Racing, a NASCAR team
 Jennifer Jo Cobb, the team owner and driver
 Jessica-Jane Clement (born 1985), British glamour model, actress and television presenter
 JJC Foundation, a charitable foundation to support the Clay Sanskrit Library
 Joliet Junior College in Illinois, United States
 Jurong Junior College in Singapore
 New Jersey Juvenile Justice Commission, a state agency of New Jersey, United States

See also
 JJCC, a South Korean hip-hop boy group